Xintang is a railway station in Xintang, Zengcheng District, Guangzhou, Guangdong Province, China. It is a station on the Guangzhou–Shenzhen railway and the under construction Guangzhou–Shanwei high-speed railway. It was built in 1910 and is now a class 4 station on the national railway station scale.

See also
Xintang South railway station, a station on Guangzhou–Shenzhen intercity railway
Xintang station (Guangzhou Metro), a metro station on Line 13 of Guangzhou Metro

References

Railway stations in China opened in 1910
Railway stations in Guangzhou
Stations on the Guangzhou–Shenzhen Railway